Tomhannock Methodist Episcopal Church is a historic Methodist Episcopal church located at Pittstown, Rensselaer County, New York. It was built in 1845, and is a one-story, vernacular Greek Revival style brick church building with a front gable roof.  It is topped by an open belfry topped by a low pyramidal roof. The interior was remodeled in 1871 and 1896. A two-story frame addition was built about 1980 to replace a two-story social hall added in 1855. The church was abandoned by United Methodist Conference in 2010 and subsequently adapted for municipal purposes.

It was listed on the National Register of Historic Places in 2014.

References

19th-century Methodist church buildings in the United States
Methodist churches in New York (state)
Churches on the National Register of Historic Places in New York (state)
Greek Revival church buildings in New York (state)
Churches completed in 1845
Churches in Rensselaer County, New York
National Register of Historic Places in Rensselaer County, New York